George Grant Watson (October 31, 1905 – April 6, 1977) was a Canadian curler. He was a member of the 1936, 1942 and 1949 Brier Champion teams (skipped by his older brother Ken Watson), playing as third, representing Manitoba. He also skipped Northern Ontario at the 1953 Macdonald Brier, leading his team of Don McEwen, Frank Sargent, and Archie Grant to a 7–3 record.

References

Brier champions
1905 births
1977 deaths
Curlers from Manitoba
Curlers from Northern Ontario
Canadian male curlers
People from Minnedosa, Manitoba